The pei pok (Khmer: ប៉ីពក) is a Cambodian musical instrument, similar to a flute and made of bamboo. While similar to a flute, it uses a single reed to create sound.

This instrument and the pey au (or pei ar) are both used in the Krom phleng arak.

External links
Sound clip of pei pok.
Image of pei pok.

References

Cambodian musical instruments
Free reed aerophones